Ameen Sayani is a popular former radio announcer from India. He achieved fame and popularity all across the Indian Subcontinent when he presented his Binaca Geetmala program of hits over the airwaves of Radio Ceylon. He is one of the most imitated announcers even today. His style of addressing the crowd with "Behno aur Bhaiyo " (meaning "sisters and brothers") as against the traditional "Bhaiyo aur Bahno"  is still treated as an announcement with a melodious touch. He has produced, compered (or spoken for) over 54,000 radio programmes and 19,000 spots/jingles since 1951.

Career
Ameen Sayani was introduced to All India Radio, Bombay, by his brother Hamid Sayani. Ameen participated in English programmes there for ten years.

Later, he helped popularise All India Radio in India. Sayani was also a part of various movies throughout the years like Bhoot Bungla, Teen Devian, Boxer, and Qatl. He appeared in all of these movies in the role of an announcer in some event.

Sayani assisted his mother, Kulsum Sayani, in editing, publishing and printing a fortnightly journal for neo-literates, under the instructions of Mahatma Gandhi. The fortnightly, RAHBER (1940 to 1960), was simultaneously published in the Devnagri (Hindi), Urdu and Gujarati scripts – but all in the simple "Hindustani" language promoted by Gandhi.

It was this grounding in simple communication that helped him in his long career of commercial broadcasting, and culminated in his being awarded the "Hindi Ratna Puraskaar" by the prestigious Hindi Bhavan of New Delhi in 2007.

One little known fact about him is that he worked in the marketing Department of Tata Oil Mills Ltd. during 1960–62 as Brand Executive – mainly looking after their toilet soaps: Hamam and Jai.

Between All India Radio (since 1951), AIR's Commercial Service (since 1970) and various foreign stations (since 1976), Sayani has produced, compered (or spoken for) over 54,000 radio programmes and 19,000 spots/jingles. (The fact is recorded in the Limca Book of Records.)

Radio shows produced and compered by Ameen Sayani

Some of the better known radio shows produced (mainly for consumer product clients):
 CIBACA (formerly BINACA) GEETMALA: broadcast since 1952 – mainly over Radio Ceylon, and later over Vividh Bharati (AIR) – for a total of over 42 years. It was again revived after a gap of 4 years, and was aired over the National Network of Vividh Bharati for 2 years as COLGATE CIBACA GEETMALA.
 S. KUMARS KA FILMI MUQADDAMA and FILMI MULAQAAT: over AIR and Vividh Bharati for 7 years.  Re-commenced, after a decade, on Vividh Bharati for a year.
 SARIDON KE SAATHI: 4 years. (AIR's first sponsored show.)
 BOURNVITA QUIZ CONTEST (in English): 8 years. (Took over from his brother and guru, Hamid Sayani, after his death in 1975.)
 SHALIMAR SUPERLAC JODI: 7 years.
 MARATHA DARBAR shows: SITARON KI PASAND, CHAMAKTAY SITARAY, MEHEKTI BAATEN, etc. : 14 years.
 SANGEET KAY SITARON KI MEHFIL : 4 years – and still running (in 2014). (The format comprises interviews and musical career sketches of top singers, composers and lyricists. Syndicated to various radio stations in India and abroad for their commercial clients.)

Sayani also produced a 13-episode radio series in the form of plays based on actual HIV/AIDS cases – including interviews with eminent doctors and social workers. (The series – entitled Swanaash –was commissioned by All India Radio, and its audio cassettes have been acquired by many NGOs for their field-work.)

Ameen Sayani's Audio Communication on Compact Discs
(And Earlier on LPs And Cassettes)

After producing several audio features on cassettes, LPs and CDs, Sayani is currently producing (for Saregama India Ltd) an unusual retrospect of his flagship radio show Geetmala on CDs. The series is called "GEETMALA KI CHHAON MEIN", of which 40 volumes (in packs of five CDs each) have already been produced and released. The volumes have been well appreciated in India and abroad.

Sayani has pioneered the export of Indian radio shows and commercials since 1976. He has exported to USA, Canada, England, UAE, Swaziland, Mauritius, South Africa, Fiji and New Zealand. In addition, he has compered several shows directly for radio stations abroad.

Ameen Sayani's successful international radio shows
"MINI INSERTIONS of FILMSTAR INTERVIEWS" : Over the British Broadcasting Corporation's Ethnic Network in the UK : 35 installments.
"MUSIC FOR THE MILLIONS" : For the BBC's World Service Radio : 6 episodes.
"VEETEE KA HUNGAMA" : Over Sunrise Radio, London : 4 ½ years.
"GEETMALA KI YAADEN":Over Radio Ummul Quwain, UAE : 4 years.
"YE BHI CHANGA WO BHI KHOOB" : Over Radio Asia, UAE : 8 months.
"HANGAMAY" : Over ethnic radio stations in Toronto, Washington, Houston, Los Angeles, San Francisco and Boston : 2 ½ years.
"SANGEET PAHELI" : Over Radio Truro, Swaziland : 1 year.

Stage Compering
Sayani has compered over 2,000 stage functions of all sorts in India, including musical variety shows, beauty contests, fashion shows, award functions, film silver jubilee functions, an International Film Festival closing session (in Delhi), concerts, seminars, workshops, and trade presentations. Has also compered stage shows abroad – in the US, Canada, UK, South Africa, UAE, the Netherlands and the West Indies.

As of 2014, Sayani is still active in radio in India.

Honours and awards
In 2009, he was presented with the Padma Shri award. Apart from this, Ameen Sayani has been a laureate of numerous awards such as:

Living Legend Award (2006) from loopFederation of Indian Chambers of Commerce & Industry, with India Radio Forum
Kaan Hall of Fame Award (2003) from Radio Mirchi (FM Network of the Times Group)
Golden Abby by Advertising Club, Bombay (2000 ) for the OUTSTANDING RADIO CAMPAIGN OF THE CENTURY ( "Binaca/Cibaca GEETMALA" ).
Hall of Fame Award (1993) from Indian Academy of Advertising Film Art (IAAFA)
Person of the Year Award (1992) Limca Book of Records
Gold medal (1991) from Indian Society of Advertisers (ISA) presented by Mr. K.R. Narayanan, then Vice-President of India.

See also
List of Binaca Geetmala annual chart toppers

References

External links 
 The Indian Broadcaster
  SLBC-creating new waves of history
 Eighty Years of Broadcasting in Sri Lanka

Living people
Indian radio personalities
Indian Ismailis
Recipients of the Padma Shri in other fields
Scindia School alumni
1932 births
All India Radio people